Greece and Indonesia established diplomatic relations in 1960. The two nations have enjoyed good relations ever since. Greece has an embassy in Jakarta, while Indonesia has an embassy in Athens. Greece and Indonesia share some similarities; both are democracies, archipelagic nations, as well as possessing notable archaeological sites. Therefore, cooperations in politics, maritime transportation and shipping, culture and tourism have potential to be explored.

History
The ancient Greek writer Ptolemy, described many places including places in Indonesia like the Barousai and Yabadiou or Sabadiou, which researchers identify respectively as Barus in Northern Sumatra and Java. 

The diplomatic relations between Greece and Indonesia was established in 1960, however it was not until the 1990s that both nations finally established resident ambassadors and embassies in each respective countries. The embassy of Indonesia in Athens was opened since 1994, while the embassy of Greece in Jakarta was opened in 1997. A few dozen Greeks reside in Indonesia, mostly in Jakarta and Bali, with most of them being freelance professionals.

During the COVID-19 pandemic, Greece donated more than 700,000 vaccines to Indonesia.

Cooperations
Greek and Indonesian governments signed numbers of cooperations and agreements, such as air service agreement. Both nations also has agreed to establish cooperations in maritime and tourism sectors, which includes shipping merchant and cruise tourism.

See also
 Foreign relations of Greece
 Foreign relations of Indonesia

Notes

External links 
 Greek Ministry of Foreign Affairs about the relation with Indonesia
 Embassy of Greece in Jakarta, Indonesia
 Embassy of Indonesia in Athens, Greece 

 
Greece
Indonesia